Carlos Martínez de Irujo may refer to:

Carlos Martínez de Irujo, 1st Marquess of Casa Irujo (1763–1824), Spanish diplomat and prime minister
Carlos Martínez de Irujo, 2nd Marquess of Casa Irujo (1802–1855), his son, Spanish politician and prime minister